Muehlenbeckia ephedroides, the leafless pohuehue or leafless muehlenbeckia, is a prostrate or climbing plant native to New Zealand.

Description
Muehlenbeckia ephedroides are grey-green, grey to grey-black in colour. It is also flexuous, striate, puberulent, and is grey to grey-black or grey-green in colour. Flowers have a pistillate and are staminate as well. Lobes are narrow-triangular, and are either white, pale yellow-green or just green in colour. They have white coloured and succulent tepals that are swollen also. The twigs are leafless.

Habitat
It can be found growing near rivers, on beaches, sand spits, and alluvial fans.

References

External links
Image

ephedroides